Queen Wonpyeong of the Ansan Gim clan was the 7th wife of King Hyeonjong of Goryeo and the youngest among his third and fourth wife.

She was born into the Ansan Gim clan as the youngest daughter of Gim Eun-bu (김은부) and Lady Yi, daughter of Yi Heo-gyeom (이허겸) from the Incheon Yi clan. Her father, Gim Eun-bu was a person who passionately supported Hyeonjong when he evacuated, so Hyeonjong reciprocated it by create a good relationship with his family. For this reason, Gim's youngest daughter received considerable respect.

In 1022 (13rd year reign of King Hyeonjong), after the death of her second older sister, Gim entered the palace and became Hyeonjong's seventh wife. They then had a daughter, Princess Hyogyeong (효경공주). Although her death date was unknown, but it seems that she died around 1028 or before it since she received her posthumous name "Wonpyeong" (원평, 元平) in 1028 and buried in Uireung Tomb (의릉, 宜陵).

References

External links 
Queen Wonpyeong on Goryeosa .
Queen Wonpyeong on Encykorea .
원평왕후 on Doosan Encyclopedia .

10th-century births
Year of birth unknown
1028 deaths
Consorts of Hyeonjong of Goryeo
11th-century Korean women